Tommaso Ximenes (died 3 November 1633) was a Roman Catholic prelate who served as Bishop of Fiesole (1620–1633).

Biography
On 16 November 1620, Tommaso Ximenes was appointed during the papacy of Pope Paul V as Bishop of Fiesole.
On 22 November 1620, he was consecrated bishop by Giovanni Garzia Mellini, Cardinal-Priest of Santi Quattro Coronati, with Attilio Amalteo, Titular Archbishop of Athenae, and Paolo De Curtis, Bishop Emeritus of Isernia, serving as co-consecrators.
He served as Bishop of Fiesole until his death on 3 November 1633.

Episcopal succession
While bishop, he was the principal co-consecrator of:

References 

17th-century Italian Roman Catholic bishops
Bishops appointed by Pope Paul V
1633 deaths